Giuliana Furci (born 12 August 1978) is a Chilean-British-Italian field mycologist, speaker, author, and founder of the world's first non-profit organization dedicated to fungi, Fundación Fungi. She is a Harvard University Associate, National Geographic Explorer, Author of the first mushroom field guide in Chile, Co-Chair of the IUCN Fungal Conservation Committee and co-author of titles such as the 1st State of the World’s Fungi and the paper delimiting the term Funga.

Biography 
Giuliana was born in London to a Chilean mother (Ximena George-Nascimento) and Italian father (Carmelo Furci). Her mother was a Chilean refugee who had fled her country because of the 1973 coup, having been a political prisoner for 365 days between 1973 and 1974. Her father is from the village of Dinami in Calabria, Italy.

At the age of 14, Giuliana left London for Chile with her mother.

Career 
In 1999, Giuliana began her career as a self-taught mycologist while studying aquaculture in the Universidad de Los Lagos in Osorno, Chile. She traveled through Chile documenting fungi from 2000-2005 with her colleague Carolina Magnasco. This journey yielded a collection of over 6,000 photographs and hundreds of collections of fungi. 

In 2005, Giuliana flew to Washington State and took her first class with Paul Stamets at Fungi Perfecti, titled Growing Gourmet and Medicinal Fungi. Upon her return to Chile, Carolina Magnasco and Giuliana opened a Reishi Cultivation farm in Santiago called “Fungi Australe SA” which operated for 2 years before closing due to the choice of not pursuing a career in a for-profit business.

In 2007, Giuliana wrote her first book “Fungi Austral”, a field guide to Chilean austral fungi. From late 2005-2010 Giuliana worked for Terram Foundation as the salmon farming program coordinator. 

In 2012, Giuliana founded the Fundación Fungi. Her work triggered the inclusion of fungi in Chilean environmental legislation and made it possible to assess the conservation status of over 80 species of fungi. Fundación Fungi (Fungi Foundation) was the first NGO in the world dedicated to the protection of fungi, and has offices in Chile and the USA. She has published two field guides on Chilean fungi: Guías de campo Hongos de Chile Volumen I and Volumen II. 

Giuliana is the curator of the FFCL Fungarium, which is continuously studied in collaboration with experts from Harvard University, Conicet Argentina, and the University of Florida. As a field mycologist, she helped describe three new species: Amanita galactica, Cortinarius chlorosplendidus, and Psilocybe stametsii. She has conducted mycological expeditions in close to 20 countries.

Media and Awards 
She has been recognized and awarded by the McKenna Academy, Mycological Society of America and the National Geographic Society. Her work with the Fungi Foundation has been featured in international media such as the New York Times, the Guardian, Science Magazine, BBC, The Atlantic and the Times of India.

References 

1978 births
Women mycologists
21st-century Chilean scientists
Scientists from London
Chilean people of Italian descent
Living people